Kawas  refers to an Amis supernatural entity. Though the Amis have converted to Christianity, their spiritual beliefs and Christianity have syncretized and the term kawas is still used.  

Kawas are divided into 6 groups: gods, ancestors, souls of living, spirits of living things, spirits of lifeless objects, and ghosts and mysterious beings, giving their blessing or calamities to mortals according to myths about them . Bamboo oracle specialists were among communicators. Lisin, or ceremony, was the preferred method to cope with kawas.

Terms
I. Introduction of Kawas

Kawas is a root word used to describe a spiritual practitioner, healer, or shaman in the Amis culture. 

II. Meaning and function of kawas: 
It is believed that Kawas are messengers of Kakrayan or God, the Almighty and creator of everything. They have the power to see into the past and future and are said to regulate the world according to Kakrayan’s plan. Kawasan (kawas+an) refers to something mysterious and may have had a deeper meaning as a dwelling place for kawas. Kawas is a set of spiritual beliefs and may be considered to be a religion, Beliefs and Practices. 

Kakrayan, the Almighty: The concept of spiritual healers has long been a part of many cultures, including the Amis people. This includes the belief in a great and powerful creator, Kakrayan, who is responsible for all that exists and regulates the world according to his will.
 
III. Role of kawas in regulating the world:
Kawas are believed to be messengers of this divine power, capable of seeing into both the past and the future. They are thought to regulate the world in accord with the will of Kakrayan. Kaawsakawas, a spiritual belief system:
kawas refers to.

See also
 Hanitu, the Bunun term for spirit.
According to hindu mythology kakarayan is 11th avatara of Narayan-vishnu the almighty.

References

Asian ghosts
Formosan mythology
Taiwanese deities